Kodinar railway station is a  railway station on the Western Railway network in the state of Gujarat, India. Kodinar railway station is 70 km away from Veraval Junction railway station. Passenger trains halt here.

References

See also
 Gir Somnath district

Railway stations in Gir Somnath district
Bhavnagar railway division